The Mengkibol was a Malaysian railway halt located at and named after the town of Mengkibol, Kluang District, Johor. Originally operating as a railway station with a mini side freight godown, it operated as a halt before closure. However, when the Gemas-Johor Bahru double-tracking and electrification project is complete, Mengkibol station will cease passenger services and be re-opened to only serve freight trains.

See also
 Rail transport in Malaysia

Kluang District
KTM ETS railway stations
Railway stations in Johor